Mor humus is a form of humus occurring mostly in coniferous forests where there are few earthworms and micro organisms to decompose soil organic matter.

The evergreen needles that litter the forest floor are slow to decompose, in part due to their chemical composition (low pH, high carbon), but also because of the generally cool temperatures and low microbial activity. Unlike other types of humus, the litter layer is substantial and well-differentiated from the fermentation layer, and the fermentation layer remains distinct from the humus layer. It is one of three classifications of humus (decomposed material that can no longer be identified as plant origin after undergoing the humification process.)

Characteristics

The decomposition rate is very slow in mor soils. The fermentation layer below the litter layer consists of plant remains still in varying degrees of decomposition. The humus layer of fully decomposed plant material lies beneath these two laters. In comparison, the fermentation and humus layers are not distinguishable in mull soils due to earthworm and micro organism activity that assists with rapid decomposition of organic materials.

Mor soils are usually very acidic. They are usually cold, wet soils under coniferous forests. Soil mites are more common in acidic soils topped with mor humus than in other types of soils. Mycorrhizal tips per unit of volume are greater in mor soils than mull soils.

See also
Moder humus

References

Soil